Bingo! Comedy Adda is an Indian Hindi-language comedy series created by Bingo! in collaboration with StarPlus.

The first season was hosted by Indian prankster and comedian RJ Naved Khan. The first season premiered on 7 February 2021.

The second season was hosted by Varun Sharma

Premise 
Each episode starts with a segment called "Mad News" in which Naved shares with viewers funny news stories that revolve around social media. The host then introduces the celebrities of the day. In every episode, celebrities are invited as guests and asked to share their funny stories. Following this they are asked questions relating to recent events and their personal lives in a round called "Tedhe Questions".

Presenter

Season 1
 Naved Khan

Season 2
Varun Sharma

Guests

Season 1
 Harbhajan Singh
 Nushrratt Bharuccha
 Bhuvan Bam
 Sumeet Vyas
 Nidhi Singh
 Neena Gupta
 Farah Khan
 Aparshakti Khurana
 Vijay Varma
 Ranveer Singh

Season 2
Shehnaaz Gill
Manushi Chhillar
Bhuvan Bam
Mouni Roy
Sharvari Wagh
Divyenndu Sharma 
Yashraj Mukhate
Guru Randhawa
Virendra Sehwag
Ashish Chanchlani

References

External links 
 Sponsor's Show Site
 Full Episodes on Sponsor's YouTube

2021 Indian television series debuts
Indian comedy television series
Indian television talk shows